The Nicolaus Copernicus Polish-German Research Award (also known as Copernicus Award) is a biannual science award conferred by Deutsche Forschungsgemeinschaft and Foundation for Polish Science "to the individuals most active in Polish-German scientific cooperation who have made exceptional research achievements as a result of that cooperation." The award was established in 2006 and is named after Renaissance astronomer and polymath Nicolaus Copernicus (1473-1543). It carries a cash prize of €200,000 shared equally by two winners, one from Germany and one from Poland. In order to be eligible for the award, candidates must have at least a doctoral degree and work in Polish or German scientific institutions.

Permanent members of the Jury of the Copernicus Award include: Grażyna Jurkowlaniec (University of Warsaw) – chair of the Jury; Immo Fritsche (Leipzig University) – deputy chair of the Jury; Bernd Büchner (IFW Dresden); Paweł Idziak (Jagiellonian University); Maria Mittag (University of Jena); Marek Samoć (Wrocław University of Technology).

Copernicus Award winners

See also 

 List of general science and technology awards 
 Prize of the Foundation for Polish Science
 Polish-German relations
 Brückepreis

References

European awards
German awards
Polish awards
awards established in 2006